Ballyea is a Gaelic Athletic Association club in the parish of Ballyea/Clarecastle in County Clare, Ireland founded in 1935.

History
In 2016, Ballyea coached by Robbie Hogan won their first ever Clare Senior Hurling Championship when they defeated Clonlara in the final by 2–14 to 1–14 after a replay.
The next week on 6 November, they defeated Thurles Sarsfields from Tipperary in the Munster Semi-final by 4–18 to 1–22 after extra-time.
On 20 November 2016, Ballyea won the Munster Senior Club Hurling Championship after a 1–21 to 2–10 victory over Glen Rovers at Semple Stadium.
On 4 February 2017, Ballyea qualified for the 2017 All-Ireland Senior Club Hurling Championship Final after a 1–19 to 2–14 win against St. Thomas in the semi-final at Semple Stadium.
Having led by 13 points in the second half, they overcame a late fightback by St. Thomas's to win by 2 points.
In the final on 17 March 2017 against Cuala from Dublin, Ballyea lost by 2–19 to 1–10.

In 2018, Ballyea captained by Tony Kelly won their second county senior hurling title after a 1-20 to 1-14 victory against Cratloe.

In 2022, Ballyea completed their first ever back-to-back county championship win, with James Murphy lifting the Canon Hamilton trophy, with a one point win over their neighbours Éire Óg, Ennis, a year after beating Inagh-Kilnamona by the same margin in 2021

Major honours
 All-Ireland Senior Club Hurling Championship Runners-Up: 2017
 Munster Senior Club Hurling Championship (1): 2016
 Clare Senior Hurling Championship (4): 2016, 2018, 2021, 2022
 Clare Intermediate Hurling Championship (2): 1944, 2001
 Clare Junior A Hurling Championship (3): 1940, 1982, 1991
 Clare Under-21 A Hurling Championship (1): 2012

Notable players
 Jack Browne
 Paul Flanagan
 Tony Griffin
 Tony Kelly
 Gary Brennan

References

External links
Clare GAA site
Clare GAA club sites
Clare on Hoganstand.com

Gaelic games clubs in County Clare
Hurling clubs in County Clare